Agrypnini is a tribe of click beetles in the family Elateridae.

Genera
 Acrocryptus Candèze, 1874
 Adelocera Latreille, 1829
 Agraeus Candèze, 1857
 Agrypnus Eschscholtz, 1829
 Candanius Hayek, 1973
 Carlota Arias-Bohart, 2014
 Christinea Gurjeva, 1987
 Compresselater Platia & Gudenzi, 2006
 Compsolacon Reitter, 1905
 Danosoma Thomson, 1859
 Dilobitarsus Latreille, 1834
 Eidolus Candèze, 1857
 Elasmosomus Schwarz, 1902
 Hemicleus Candèze, 1857
 Lacon Laporte, 1838
 Meristhus Candèze, 1857
 Octocryptus Candèze, 1892
 Optaleus Candèze, 1857
 Rismethus Fleutiaux, 1947
 Saudilacon Chassain, 1983
 Scaphoderus Candèze, 1857
 Stangellus Golbach, 1975
 Sulcilacon Fleutiaux, 1927
 Trieres Candèze, 1900

References

External links
 

Elateridae